DAE or Dae may refer to:

As an acronym
 DAE (chemotherapy), a chemotherapy regimen consisting of Daunorubicin, Ara-C (cytarabine) and Etoposide
 Daporijo Airport, the IATA code for an airport in India
 Daxing Airport Express, the airport transit service to Beijing Daxing International Airport in Beijing, China
 Department of Atomic Energy, an Indian government department responsible for administration of India's nuclear programme
 Design Academy Eindhoven, a design school in Eindhoven, the Netherlands
 Destacamento de Acções Especiais, Special Actions Detachment, a Portuguese naval commando unit
 Dictionary of American English, a 1938 dictionary of terms appearing in English in the United States (20th century)
 Differential-algebraic equation, a general form of differential equation, given in implicit form
 Digidesign Audio Engine, an American digital audio technology company
 Digital Asset Exchange (.dae), the filename extension used by COLLADA
 Digital audio editor, a computer application for audio editing
 Digital audio extraction (ripping), the process of copying the audio data from one media form to a hard disk
 Diploma of Associate Engineering, a 3-year engineering diploma in Pakistan offered after 10th grade
 Dubai Aerospace Enterprise, a global aerospace, manufacturing and services corporation
 Dutch Antilles Express, an airline company in the Antilles

People
 Dae Dae (born 1992), American rapper from Atlanta, Georgia, U.S.
 Dae Gak (born 1947), Zen master and guiding teacher of Furnace Mountain, Clay City, Kentucky, U.S.
 Dae Hui Cho, professional Warcraft III competition
 Dae Imlani (born 1954), Filipino swimmer
 Dae Kwang (born 1944), guiding teacher of the Providence Zen Center, Cumberland, Rhode Island, U.S.
 Dae Sung Lee (born 1958), Korean-American master of taekwondo
 Kings of Balhae, 698–926, in Korea

Other uses
 Dae (film), a 1979 Yugoslavian short documentary film directed by Stole Popov
 Dae Jang-gum, a 2003 Korean television series directed by Lee Byung-hoon